Dimitris Horn (9 March 1921 – 16 January 1998) was a Greek theatrical and film performer of modern times.

Biography
Horn was born in Athens in 1921, the son of playwright Pantelis Horn (himself descended from an Austrian father and Greek mother), and Euterpi, a Pontic Greek. He studied Drama at the National Theatre of Greece Drama School, where he made his stage debut in 1941. During his career, he co-operated many times with the Greek National Theater and made personal stage troops with actors such as Mary Aroni, Alekos Alexandrakis and Ellie Lambeti. The latter was also his companion from 1953 to 1958.

From an early stage he developed a reputation as "the best actor of his generation," performing many classics such as "Diary of a Madman" by Nikolai Gogol, Richard III by William Shakespeare, Dom Juan by Molière, and Enrico IV by Luigi Pirandello to critical acclaim.

His screen work was less important to him; he disliked cinema, only starring in  ten films. His most notable films were The Counterfeit Coin (1954) and  A Girl in Black (1956). He later married shipping heiress Anna Goulandri, and became the first director of the Greek State Radio and Television after the restoration of democracy. He died of cancer on 16 January 1998, aged 76.

Filmography
Athens by Night - I Athina tin nychta 1962 ..... himself
Woe to the Young - Alimono stous neous, 1961 ..... Andreas
A Thief's First Chance - Mia tou klefti, 1960 ..... Pavlos Lignos
We Have Only One Life - Mia zoi tin echoume, 1958 ..... Kleon
The Girl in Black - To Koritsi me ta mavra, 1956 ..... Pavlos
The Counterfeit Sovereign - Kalpiki lira, 1955 ..... Pavlos
Windfall in Athens - Kyriakatiko xypnima, 1954 ..... Alexis Lorentzatos
The Drunkard - Methistakas, 1950 ..... Alec Bakas
Applause - Hirokrotimata, 1944 ..... Stefanos
Voice of the Heart - I Foni tis kardias, 1943 ..... Petros

External references 
 Dimitris Horn on IMDB

References

Greek male film actors
Greek male stage actors
Greek people of Austrian descent
Male actors from Athens
1921 births
1998 deaths
Recipients of the Order of George I
Deaths from cancer in Greece
20th-century Greek male actors
Burials at the First Cemetery of Athens
Goulandris family